The Yeshiva of Rochester (formerly the Talmudical Institute of Upstate New York or TIUNY) is an all-male educational institution for high school- and college-age young men located in Rochester, New York. It is primarily an American, Lithuanian style Haredi but non-Hasidic yeshiva. TIUNY was founded in 1974 as the first external affiliate branch of the Chofetz Chaim education network by Rabbi Menachem Davidowitz and Rabbi Dovid Harris.

In 2004, TIUNY opened its own day school, Derech HaTorah of Rochester, offering grades kindergarten through 8th.

Notable alumni
 Yaakov Shwekey, Jewish singer

References

External links
 

Educational institutions established in 1974
Lithuanian-Jewish culture in New York (state)
Men's universities and colleges in the United States
Mesivtas
Private high schools in New York (state)
Schools in Monroe County, New York
Boys' schools in New York (state)